At the 1986 Goodwill Games, the athletics competition was held in July 1986 at the Olympic Stadium in Moscow, Soviet Union. A total of 42 events were contested, of which 23 by male and 19 by female athletes. 

In contrast to other major athletics competitions, the Goodwill Games operated an invitational policy, which meant that there were no qualifying stage of the events and the contests operated on a single or double final format. The inaugural athletics competition brought two new world records: Sergey Bubka cleared 6.01 m for a new pole vault record and Jackie Joyner improved the women's heptathlon record to 7148 points. In the 100 metres races, Ben Johnson gained his first international victory over Carl Lewis while Evelyn Ashford pipped Heike Drechsler to the gold in the women's race.

The Soviet Union dominated the medal table, winning 50% more medals than the United States.

Records

Medal summary

Men

Women

Medal table

References

Results
Goodwill Games. GBR Athletics. Retrieved on 2010-06-24.
Athletics results. Goodwill Games. Retrieved on 2010-06-24.

External links
Official website

1986 Goodwill Games
1986
Goodwill Games
International athletics competitions hosted by the Soviet Union
1986 Goodwill Games